The Alamut River is a river of northern Iran. It flows through the southern Alborz mountain range into the Shah River. The Taliqan and Alamut rivers conjoin to form the Shah River.

Central Alborz mountain range map
The Alamut River is #1 in the upper right of the map.

References

Rivers of Alborz Province
Rivers of Mazandaran Province
Alborz (mountain range)
Tributaries of the Sefīd-Rūd